Arianus may refer to:

 Arianus was an ancient Greek of the 3rd century BCE; he was a friend of Bolis, and was employed by him to betray Achaeus to Antiochus III the Great in 214 BCE.
 From Ariana, a term used by some Greek and Roman authors for a wide area of Central Asia
 From Arius, an Achaemenid region centered on the city of Herat in present-day western Afghanistan
 Saint Arianus, 3rd century governor of Ansena, killer of martyrs such as Saint Colluthus, later a Coptic saint himself
 Arianus, a fictional world in the Death Gate Cycle by Margaret Weis and Tracy Hickman
 Apodemus arianus, a mouse of family Muridae
 Eriophyes arianus, a species of acari in genus Eriophyes

See also
 Arianus's rat, a rat of family Muridae
 Arrianus (disambiguation)
 Ariano (disambiguation)
 Arius